Donald Mathieson, Donald Matheson, Don Mathieson, or Don Mathesonmay refer to:

 Donald Mathieson (cricketer) (born 1931), Australian cricketer
 Donald Mathieson (businessman), chairman of the Caledonian Railway
 Don Matheson (1929–2014), actor
 Donald Matheson (politician) in 1870 Manitoba general election
 Donald Matheson (missionary) on list of Protestant missionaries in China
 Donald Matheson of Shin, of Clan Matheson
 Donald Macleod Matheson (1896–1979), Secretary to the National Trust
 Donald Matheson, British Army officer, see 1887 Golden Jubilee Honours
 Don Mathieson (lawyer), New Zealand Queens' Council